Michael C. Questier is an English academic and historian.

Questier studied at Worth School and Balliol College, Oxford. In 1991 he completed a D.Phil at the University of Sussex on early modern politico-religious history. He has published works on post-Reformation history, and English Catholicism between the early Reformation and the English Civil War, particularly focusing on anti-popery, aristocratic culture, the Jacobean exchequer, and the experience of conversion. He taught at Worcester College, Oxford, was a British Academy Postdoctoral Fellow at King's College London, and in 2002, became a senior lecturer at Queen Mary, University of London, subsequently becoming its Professor of Early Modern British and European History. He has also been a Visiting Fellow at All Souls College, Oxford.

Published works
"Conversion, Politics and Religion in England, 1580-1625", Cambridge Studies in Early Modern British History (1996) 
The Politics of Religious Conformity and the Accession of James I, Article (2002) 
*Newsletters from the Caroline Court, 1631-1638: Volume 26: Catholicism and the Politics of the Personal Rule, Camden Fifth Series xvi+358 (2005) 
"Elizabeth and the Catholics" in Catholics and the Protestant Nation: Religious Politics and Identity in Early Modern England, Manchester University Press, edited by E. Shagan, pp. 63–94 (2005)
"Catholicism and Community in Early Modern England: Politics, Aristocratic Patronage and Religion, c.1550-1640", Cambridge Studies in Early Modern British History (2006) 
"Arminianism, Catholicism and Puritanism in England during the 1630s", Historical Journal, 49, pp. 53–78 (2006) .
"Catholic Loyalism in Early Stuart England", English Historical Review, cxxiii, pp. 1132–65 (2008)Stuart Dynastic Policy and Religious Politics, 1621-1625, Cambridge University Press for the Royal Historical Society (2009) 

Co-authored published works
England's long reformation, 1500-1800, Nicholas Tyacke UCL Press Ch 8, pp 195–225 (1998) with Professor Peter Lake.  | 
Newsletters from the Archpresbyterate of George Birkhead, Camden Fifth Series, (1999), with George Birkhead, The Antichrist’s Lewd Hat: Protestants, Papists and Players in Post-Reformation England, Yale University Press (2002), with Professor Peter Lake,  Conformity and Orthodoxy in the English Church, c.1560-1660, Studies in Modern British Religious History - Boydell and Brewer (2000), with Professor Peter Lake,  | The Trials of Margaret Clitherow: Persecution, Martyrdom and the Politics of Sanctity in Elizabethan England'' (2011) with Professor Peter Lake,  |

Further reading

"Religion in the State Papers 1603-1640"

Alumni of Balliol College, Oxford
Alumni of the University of Sussex
Living people
Year of birth missing (living people)
Academics of Queen Mary University of London
People educated at Worth School